Moriz Benedikt (sometimes spelled Moritz) (27 May 1849 – 18 March 1920), was a long-time editor of Neue Freie Presse and a powerful figure in Austrian politics and society.

Raised in a Jewish family in Krasice, he was the magazine's subeditor from 1872 to 1880, then associate editor and editor-in-chief from 1908 to the day he died.

The satirist Karl Kraus was a persistent critic of Benedikt ("the Lord of all Hyenas") and his paper, i.a., for their aggressive militaristic stance in the wake of World War I.

He died in Vienna.

References

1849 births
1920 deaths
Austrian Jews
19th-century Austrian journalists
Austrian newspaper editors
20th-century Austrian journalists
Burials at Döbling Cemetery